The Venerable  William Hey  was Archdeacon of Cleveland from 1875 until his death on 22 November 1882.

Hey was born at Ockbrook in 1811; educated at Sherborne School and St John's College, Cambridge;  and ordained in 1838. He was Head Master of St Peter's School, York from 1839 to 1864 when he became a Canon Residentiary at York Minster. He was member of the Yorkshire Philosophical Society for over forty years, serving on its council from 1841 subsequently as a Vice-President until his death. He served for many years as the Honorary Curator of Insects & Crustacea at the Yorkshire Museum and was succeeded in this posts by his son Rev W.C. Hey.

References

People from the Borough of Erewash
Alumni of St John's College, Cambridge
People educated at Sherborne School
Archdeacons of Cleveland
1811 births
1882 deaths
Members of the Yorkshire Philosophical Society
Yorkshire Museum people
British entomologists